This is a list of members of the 80th West Virginia Senate. It contains members of the West Virginia Senate for the 80th West Virginia Legislature, which convened in January 2011.

Leadership of the 80th West Virginia Senate

Members of the 80th West Virginia Senate, by District

See also 
 West Virginia Senate
 List of presidents of the West Virginia Senate
 List of members of the 79th West Virginia Senate
 List of members of the 78th West Virginia Senate
 List of members of the 77th West Virginia Senate
 West Virginia House of Delegates
 List of speakers of the West Virginia House of Delegates
 List of members of the 79th West Virginia House of Delegates
 List of members of the 78th West Virginia House of Delegates
 List of members of the 77th West Virginia House of Delegates

Notes

External links 
 West Virginia Legislature
 Senate District Map

West Virginia Senate 79th
West Virginia legislative sessions
80th